Stephen Maher may refer to:

 Stephen Maher (footballer) (born 1988), Irish footballer
 Stephen Maher (hurler) (born 1993), Irish hurler